Stephanoceros is a genus of rotifers belonging to the family Collothecidae.

The species of this genus are found in Europe and Northern America.

Species
 Stephanoceros fimbriatus (Goldfusz, 1820)
 Stephanoceros millsii (Kellicott, 1885)
 Stephanoceros vulgaris

References

Collothecaceae